Dhand is a Punjabi surname of the Khatri caste.

Family line
Dhands have a family temple of ancestors which goes back to 1695 AD, located at the village Pohir (Tehsil Ahmedgarh) District Ludhiana. It is just about 30 kms from Ludhiana on Ludhiana Malerkotla Road. Traditionally Dhands visit this place and pray to our Vade Vadehere (Fore-fathers) for the wellbeing of the new-borns and newly wedded couples and the Parivar (Family).

Members
An annual congregation of the Dhands from all over is also held on the Amavasia (Dark Night) following Raakhi festival, i.e., in the Moon Month of Bhadra following the month of Shraavana. Dhands as "The Dhand Parivar", i.e., the community get together and make prayers. It is a common belief that Great Grand Ancestors do shower blessings on the Dhand Parivars. In 2011 it was held on 29 August at Pohir village.

Pohir is known to be the origin of all Dhands who are all settled in the area around under Ludhiana and Sangrur Districts including Village Sidhwan Bet in Tehsil Jagraon of Ludhiana District.

Recent
As of today the Dhand's have relocated to far off places including overseas such as Australia, Canada, USA, Germany, England, Africa. In India many of the Dhand community live in Punjab, Delhi, Mumbai, Gujarat, Hyderabad, and Kolkata, succeeding in jobs and business.

One can also see many places named Dhand on the maps of India. It is not known as to how these locations are related to the community.

Other
Very closely related to the name "Dhand" are "Dhanda". Research in places like Punjab, Uttar Pradesh, have found the communities are indeed related.

Surnames
Indian surnames
Punjabi-language surnames
Surnames of Indian origin
Hindu surnames
Khatri clans
Khatri surnames